The 1894 Texas A&M Aggies football team represented the Agricultural and Mechanical College of Texas—now known as Texas A&M University—as an independent during the 1894 college football season. 1894 was the first year of football sponsored by Texas A&M. Led by F. Dudley Perkins in his first and only season as head coach, the Aggies compiled a record of 1–1.

Schedule

References

Additional sources
 "1894 Schedule/Results." Texas A&M football record, 1894. Aggie Athletics. Retrieved on May 2, 2008.
 Perry, George Sessions The Story of Texas A&M

Texas AandM
Texas A&M Aggies football seasons
Texas AandM Aggies football